"Mother, May I" is a song written and recorded by American country music artists Liz Anderson and Lynn Anderson. The song was recorded as a duet between mother and daughter. It was released as a single in 1968 via RCA Records.

Background and release
"Mother, May I" was recorded at the RCA Victor Studio in January 1968, located in Nashville, Tennessee. The sessions was produced by Felton Jarvis. Jarvis was Liz Anderson's record producer at RCA Victor Records. Also recorded at the same session was the song "Better Than Life Without You."

"Mother, May I" was released as a single in February 1968 via RCA Records. It spent a total of 12 weeks on the Billboard Hot Country Singles chart before reaching number 21 in April 1968.  It also became a top 20 hit on the Canadian RPM Country Songs chart, reaching number 16 in 1968. "Mother, May I" was the only duet recording released as a single between the mother and daughter duo. They would continue recording solo singles for their own labels in years to come. Lynn Anderson would continue recording further tracks by her mother as well.

Track listings 
7" vinyl single
 "Mother, May I" – 2:02
 "Better Than Life Without You" – 2:01

Chart performance

References

1968 singles
1968 songs
Liz Anderson songs
Lynn Anderson songs
RCA Records singles
Songs written by Liz Anderson